HMS E6 was a British E-class submarine built by Vickers Barrow-in-Furness. She was laid down on 12 November 1911 and was commissioned on 17 October 1913. She cost £106,900.

Design

The early 'Group 1' E class boats were armed with four 18 inch (450 mm) torpedo tubes, one in the bow, one either side amidships, and one in the stern; a total of eight torpedoes were carried. Group 1 boats were not fitted with a deck gun during construction, but those involved in the Dardanelles campaign had guns mounted forward of the conning tower while at Malta Dockyard.

E-Class submarines had wireless systems with  power ratings; in some submarines, these were later upgraded to  systems by removing a midship torpedo tube. Their maximum design depth was  although in service some reached depths of below .

Crew
Her complement was three officers and 28 men.

Service history
When war was declared with Germany on 5 August 1914, E6 was based at Harwich, in the 8th Submarine Flotilla of the Home Fleets.

E6 and E8 then made the first Heligoland Bight patrol. On 28 August 1914, E6 was one of eight submarines that took part in a raid against the German Heligoland Bight patrol using surface ships. Later in the day, when the light cruisers of the 1st Light Cruiser Squadron came up to support the British surface forces, they spotted E6 and, mistaking her for a German submarine, tried to ram her. On 25 September 1914, E6 fouled a mine on her hydroplane guard when on patrol in the Heligoland Bight, but managed to free herself and escape.

On 13 April 1915 E6, on patrol near Juist, spotted a German submarine, but was unable to get into position to deliver an attack. The next day she fired a torpedo at the German torpedo boat , but the torpedo missed. On 29 May 1915 E6 was one of a number of submarines ordered to sea in response to a sortie into the North Sea by the German High Seas Fleet. She spotted the German fleet on 30 May and fired a single torpedo at the German battlecruiser . E6s captain incorrectly estimated Moltkes speed, and the torpedo missed. German torpedo boats forced E6 to dive and prevented a second attack. On 1 September 1915 E6 and E8, which had been fitted with 4 six-pounder anti-aircraft guns each set out to the Bight to carry out anti-Zeppelin patrols. On 4 September E6 spotted the airship L9 and opened fire, but no hits were scored and E6 was forced to dive by the approach of an aeroplane. On 23 October E6 fired 30 shots at the German airship L7 when on patrol off Horns Rev. The airship was undamaged. That evening the German High Seas Fleet again sortied from Kiel. E6 spotted the German fleet on the morning of 24 October. E6 launched two attacks on German light cruisers, both of which were unsuccessful, although E6s crew did hear two explosions after the second attack, on the cruiser .

E6 was mined on 26 December 1915 with the loss of all hands in the North Sea off Harwich. A trawler had been sunk by a mine in the same position shortly before, and a British torpedo boat signalled E6 to avoid the minefield, but E6 ignored the warning and was lost.

Notes

References

External links
 'Submarine losses 1904 to present day' - Royal Navy Submarine Museum 

 

British E-class submarines of the Royal Navy
Ships built in Barrow-in-Furness
1912 ships
World War I submarines of the United Kingdom
World War I shipwrecks in the North Sea
Royal Navy ship names
Maritime incidents in 1915
Ships sunk by mines
Protected Wrecks of the United Kingdom